Carolus Juhani Lassila (5 August 1922 Helsinki, Finland – 26 October 1987 Atlas Mountains, Morocco) was an accomplished Finnish diplomat.

Lassila's parents were Armas Lassila, Managing Director (1890–1955) and Martha Sofia Holmberg (1888–1975). His uncles were Väinö Lassila, Professor of Anatomy, and Ilmo Lassila, Professor of Forest Technology. Carolus Lassila was married to Britta Synnöve Juliana Wilskman (1923–1987), they had two children and six grandchildren.

Lassila was an expert in Arabic language and Arab culture. He was Ambassador to Beirut, Lebanon from 1968 to 1974, during which period he was also co-accredited as Ambassador to Kuwait 1969–75, Jeddah, Saudi Arabia 1971 as well as Amman, Jordan 1972–74. After Lebanon he was Ambassador to Jeddah, Saudi Arabia from 1975–1977 and co-accredited as Ambassador to Doha, Qatar 1974, Manama, Bahrain 1975, Muscat, Oman 1975, and Abu Dhabi, United Arab Emirates 1975. Most recently Ambassador to Madrid, Spain 1984–1987 as well as Morocco .

Carolus Lassila and his wife died in a flash river flood in the Atlas Mountains of Morocco on their way from Ouarzazate to Taznakht, 400 kilometers south of Rabat on October 26, 1987.

References 

Ambassadors of Finland to Saudi Arabia
Ambassadors of Finland to Lebanon
Ambassadors of Finland to Kuwait
Ambassadors of Finland to the United Arab Emirates
Ambassadors of Finland to Spain
1922 births
1987 deaths
Road incident deaths in Morocco
Ambassadors of Finland to Morocco